The 1978 American Airlines Tennis Games was a men's tennis tournament played on outdoor hard courts. It was the fifth edition of the Indian Wells Masters and was part of the 1978 Colgate-Palmolive Grand Prix. The tournament was played at the Mission Hills Country Club in Rancho Mirage, California in the United States and held from February 13 through February 19, 1978. Roscoe Tanner won the singles title.

Finals

Singles

 Roscoe Tanner defeated  Raúl Ramírez 6–1, 7–6
 It was Tanner's 2nd title of the year and the 24th of his career.

Doubles

 Raymond Moore /  Roscoe Tanner defeated  Bob Hewitt /  Frew McMillan 6–4, 6–4
 It was Moore's 1st title of the year and the 5th of his career. It was Tanner's 1st title of the year and the 23rd of his career.

References

External links
 
 ATP tournament profile

 
1978 American Airlines Tennis Games
American Airlines Tennis Games
American Airlines Tennis Games
American Airlines Tennis Games
American Airlines Tennis Games